Giarre is a comune (municipality) in the Metropolitan City of Catania, Sicily.

Geography
Giarre is bounded by the municipalities of Acireale, Mascali, Milo, Riposto, Sant'Alfio, Santa Venerina and Zafferana Etnea. It forms a conurbation with the coastal town of Riposto.

History
Some historians suppose that the ancient Greek city of Kallipolis was situated in the same territory of the present-day town of Giarre, but nowadays there is no relevant proof of it.

Since the late 16th century until 1815 Giarre was a village of the county of Mascali.

During the fascist era Giarre was joined to Riposto under the name of Jonia, but separated again in 1945.

Main sights

The neo-classical cathedral, begun in 1794, is dedicated to the Spaniard St. Isidore, patron of Madrid.

Other sights include:
Oratory of St. Filippo Neri (18th century)
Sanctuary of Maria Santissima della Strada, the oldest church in the town (dating to 1081). Today little remains of the original medieval structure, having been replaced by a neoclassicist edifice.
Museum of Uses and Customs of the Etna people
Mediterraneum Aquarium

Giarre has attracted attention for its numerous unfinished buildings and amenities, initiated with public money in the 1990s but never used. A small number have been converted to other uses, including a multi-storey car park; residents also see the prospect of some tourism, as the town has come to be regarded as the centre of this style of urban planning.

Twin towns
 Cismon del Grappa, Italy, since 1969

See also
Giarre F.C.
Giarre-Riposto

References

External links

Cities and towns in Sicily